Pyrausta gemmiferalis is a moth in the family Crambidae. It was described by Zeller in 1852. It is found in South Africa.

References

Endemic moths of South Africa
Moths described in 1852
gemmiferalis
Moths of Africa